Nataliya Georgiyevna Medvedeva (14 July 1958, Leningrad – 3 February 2003, Moscow) was a Russian poet, writer, singer, and frontwoman of the hard rock bands Tribunal Natalii Medvedevoy and NATO.

Career
At the age of 17, Medvedeva moved to Los Angeles where she found work as a model, posing for Playboy and for the cover of The Cars' self-titled debut album in 1978, photographed by Elliot Gilbert.

She was married to Eduard Limonov, a controversial Russian writer and later leader of the National Bolshevik Party, whom she met in 1982 in Los Angeles. Her LA period is depicted in her novel Hotel California (1989).  In 1982, Medvedeva moved to Paris and became a piano bar singer. She wrote poetry, essays for French magazines, and published two novels in 1985 and 1987. In 1989 she participated in a collective poetry project, The Last 16 December 1989, together with poets Oleg Prokofiev and Anton Koslov Mayr. This project was published as a book the same year by William Brui.

In the early 1990s, Medvedeva introduced herself as a Novy Vzglyad representative in France.

In October 1993 Medvedeva initiated an appeal to end the siege of the White House (Russian parliament) organized by Boris Yeltsin. An open letter signed by a number of Russian artists and writers was published by the French press.  In late 1993 Medvedeva, following Limonov, moved to Moscow. They separated in 1995. In the late 1990s Medvedeva had a relationship with Serguei Vysokosov, the lead guitarist from Corrosia Metalla. She recorded two albums in Russia – Trubinal Natalii Medvedevoi (Natalya Medvedeva's Tribunal) and A U Nikh Byla Strast''' ("They had a passion").

At the time of her death, Medvedeva was living in Moscow.  She died in her sleep of a heart attack on 3 February 2003, at the age of 44. Her ex-husband Eduard Limonov maintained that she committed suicide by an overdose of heroin. Her ashes were spread over four main cities of her life: St. Petersburg, Moscow, Paris and Los Angeles.

Published worksMama, ia zhulika liubliu!: roman. New York: Russica Publishers, 1988, c. 1987. 
 "Poslednee 16-e Dekabrya 1989 goda", Atelier William Brui, Paris, 1989Otelʹ "Kalifornia": roman, rasskazy Moskva: Literaturno-khudozh. zhurnal "Glagol", 1992. Moya borʹba Belgorod: "Vspyshki", 1994. Ia reyu znamenem--: stikhi Sankt-Peterburg: "Iskusstvo-SPB", 1995. Liubovʹ s alkogolem; V strane chudes (Russkaya tetradʹ) Belgorod: "Vspyshki", 1995. A u nikh byla strastʹ-- Moskva: Vagrius, 1999. Zhiznʹ v "No future"'' Moskva: Zapasnyĭ vykhod/Emergency Exit, 2005.

See also
 Novy Vzglyad
 Yevgeny Dodolev
 Valeriya Novodvorskaya
 Alexander Prokhanov

References

External links
 Natalya Medvedeva on the website of National Bolshevik Party
 
 Natalya Medvedeva
 Natalya Medvedeva's Archive
 

1958 births
2003 deaths
Musicians from Saint Petersburg
American writers of Russian descent
National Bolshevik Party politicians
Burials in Russia
American rock musicians
20th-century American musicians